Fortignathus is an extinct genus of dyrosaurid or peirosaurid crocodylomorph known from the Late Cretaceous Echkar Formation in Niger. It contains a single species, Fortignathus felixi, which was originally named as a species of Elosuchus in 2002.

References 

Crocodylomorphs
Fossil taxa described in 2016